Théberge or Theberge may refer to:

People 
Carole Théberge (born 1953), marketing professional and former political figure in Quebec
Greg Theberge (born 1959), retired Canadian ice hockey player, grandson of former NHL player Dit Clapper
James Daniel Theberge (born 1930), United States ambassador to Nicaragua and Chile
Raymond Théberge, Commissioner of Official Languages of Canada

Other 
Théberge v. Galerie d'Art du Petit Champlain Inc., a Supreme Court of Canada case on copyright
16212 Theberge (2000 CB84), a main-belt asteroid discovered on February 4, 2000